Thomas Jermyn (March 1604 – 11 November 1659) was an English courtier and politician who sat in the House of Commons for various seats between 1625 and 1644. He supported the Royalist cause in the English Civil War.

Early life
Jermyn was the son of Sir Thomas Jermyn of Rushbrooke, Suffolk and his wife Catherine Killigrew, daughter of Sir William Killigrew. He was born in Hanworth, the seat of the Killigrews, and raised at the Jermyn seat of Rushbrooke Hall. He was admitted at Emmanuel College, Cambridge on 13 June 1622, and was awarded BA in 1626 and MA in 1629. Through his father and grandparents, Jermyn had close connections to the Stuart royal court. In 1623, he was made a page in the service of Prince Charles, and attended on the Prince during his Spanish journey that year.

Career
In 1624, Jermyn was elected Member of Parliament for Bere Alston under the patronage of Lord Mountjoy. In 1625 he was elected MP for Leicester. He was subsequently elected MP for Lancaster in 1626 and for Clitheroe in 1628, sitting until 1629 when King Charles I decided to dissolve parliament. In 1626, Jermyn had been appointed as an equerry to the king, and that year he publicly resisted attempts by the Commons to impeach the king's favourite, the Duke of Buckingham. This included accidently revealing the confidential views of the king’s immediate circle while criticising Dudley Digges, who was leading the attempts to impeach Buckingham.

In April 1640, Jermyn was elected Member of Parliament for Corfe Castle together with his brother Henry Jermyn in the Short Parliament, and in November 1640, the brothers were elected MPs for Bury St Edmunds in the Long Parliament. As the civil approached in 1642, Jermyn sided with King Charles and in September 1643 the Roundheads officially discharged him from parliament. Jermyn attended the royalist Oxford Parliament in 1644. In the following year he succeeded to his father's estate, which was ostensibly worth £1,980 a year. However, all of his lands were mortgaged, and he went into exile after the eventual royalist defeat in the war. In January 1651, he returned to Suffolk where he lived quietly under The Protectorate until his death in November 1659.

Marriage and children
In 1629, Jermyn married Rebecca Rodway, the daughter and heiress of William Rodway of London. Together they had four sons and four daughters. Jermyn was the father of Thomas Jermyn, who inherited the title of Baron Jermyn from Jermyn's brother Henry in 1684, and of Henry Jermyn, who was a Roman Catholic and became a favourite of James II of England. In 1661, Jermyn's widow married Henry Brouncker, 3rd Viscount Brouncker.

References

 

 

 

 

1604 births
1659 deaths
Cavaliers
Alumni of Emmanuel College, Cambridge
Court of Charles I of England
English MPs 1624–1625
English MPs 1625
English MPs 1626
English MPs 1628–1629
English MPs 1640 (April)
English MPs 1640–1648
Thomas
Members of the Parliament of England for Bere Alston
People from Lancaster, Lancashire
People from Rushbrooke with Rougham